Lago dell'Accesa is a lake at Massa Marittima in the Province of Grosseto, Tuscany, Italy. At an elevation of 157 m, its surface area is 0.14 km².

Lakes of Tuscany